One Utah Center is a skyscraper in downtown Salt Lake City, Utah.  It was built by the Boyer Company in 1991. The building has 24 floors with the 24th containing two conference rooms.

References

External links

 3D Model of the building from Google

1991 establishments in Utah
Office buildings completed in 1991
Skyscraper office buildings in Salt Lake City